Mount Brewer is on the Great Western Divide, a sub-range of the Sierra Nevada in  California. It is located in Kings Canyon National Park,

The peak was named for William Henry Brewer who worked on the first California Geological Survey and was the first Chair of Agriculture at Yale University's Sheffield Scientific School. He was chief of the field party that explored the central High Sierra in 1864.

See also 
 California 4000 meter peaks
 Thirteener

References 

Mountains of Tulare County, California
Mountains of Kings Canyon National Park
Mountains of Northern California